Messier 109 (also known as NGC 3992) is a barred spiral galaxy exhibiting a weak inner ring structure around the central bar approximately  away in the northern constellation Ursa Major. M109 can be seen south-east of the star Phecda (γ UMa, Gamma Ursa Majoris).

History
Messier 109 was discovered by Pierre Méchain in 1781. Two years later Charles Messier catalogued the object, as an appended object to his publication.

Between the 1920s through the 1950s, it was considered that Messier objects over 103 were not official, but later the additions, further referred target objects from Méchain, became more widely accepted. David H. Levy mentions the modern 110 object catalog while Sir Patrick Moore places the limit at 104 objects but has M105 to 109 listed as addenda. By the late 1970s all 110 objects are commonly used among astronomers and remain so.

General information

In March 1956 came M109's sole event-observed supernova, 1956A. It was a type Ia supernova in the south-east part of the galaxy, glowing at magnitude 12.8, reaching 12.3 at its maximum.

This galaxy is by far the most distant object in the Messier Catalog, followed by M91.

M109 has three satellite galaxies (UGC 6923, UGC 6940 and UGC 6969) and possibly more. Detailed hydrogen line observations have been obtained from M109 and its satellites. M109's H I (H one) distribution is regular with a low-level radial extension outside the stellar disc, while in the bar is a central H I hole in the gas distribution. Possibly the gas has been transported inwards by the bar, and because of the emptiness of the hole no large accretion events can have happened in the recent past.

M109 is the brightest galaxy in the M109 Group, a large group of galaxies in the constellation Ursa Major that may number over 50.

Gallery

See also
 List of Messier objects
 NGC 1300 – a similar barred spiral galaxy

References

External links

 
 M109

Barred spiral galaxies
M109 Group
Ursa Major (constellation)
109
NGC objects
06937
Astronomical objects discovered in 1781
037617
+09-20-044
11549+5339
Discoveries by Pierre Méchain